Wat Phrik is a subdistrict in the Mueang Phitsanulok District of Phitsanulok Province, Thailand.

Geography
The topography of Wat Phrik is flat lowlands. The subdistrict is bordered to the north by Tha Pho, to the east by Bueng Phra to the south by Wang Nam Khu and Ngio Ngam, and to the west by Wang Ithok of Bang Rakam District.  Wat Phrik lies in the Nan Basin, which is part of the Chao Phraya Watershed.  The Nan River flows through the center of the subdistrict.

History
Wan Phrik was originally part of tambon Bueng Phra.  The subdistrict has a history of chili pepper farming, from whence it derives its name. Docks along the banks of the Nan River in Wat Phrik have been used throughout history for transporting agricultural products to other regions.

Administration
The following is a list of the subdistrict's muban (villages):

Mubans numbered 1 through 5 are in the eastern portion of the district, whereas 6 through 12 are in the west.

Economy
The present economy of Wat Phrik relies on rice farming, farming of other crops, and fish and chicken farming.

Education
The following is a list of schools in Wat Phrik:
Ban Mai Temple School
East Tha Rong Temple School
In See Temple School
Sao Hin Temple School
West Tha Rong Temple School

Temples
The following is a list of temples in Wat Phrik:
Wat Ban Mai in Ban Mai
Wat In See in Ban Wat Phrik
Wat Lom in Ban Wang Sam Sa
Wat Phai Long Rat Jayrin in Ban Wat Phrik (Sao Hin)
Wat Sao Hin in Ban Yang Thon
Wat Tha Rong Thawan Thok in Ban Tha Rong
Wat Tha Rong Thawan Ok in Ban Tha Rong

Governmental bodies
Wat Phrik Public Health Center
Sao Hin Public Health Center
Wat Phrik Instructional Center
Tambon Wat Phrik administrative office
Police Station

Attractions
The following attractions can be found in Wat Phrik:
Preserved ancient long-boat
Boat library
World's tallest Crown-of-Thorns Shrub (Euphorbia milii)

References

Tambon of Phitsanulok province
Populated places in Phitsanulok province